Greece competed at the 1994 Winter Olympics in Lillehammer, Norway.

Competitors
The following is the list of number of competitors in the Games.

Alpine skiing

Women

Biathlon

Men

Bobsleigh

Cross-country skiing

Men

Luge

Men

Women

References

Official Olympic Reports

Nations at the 1994 Winter Olympics
1994
Olympics